is a Japanese freestyle skier. He competed at the 1994 Winter Olympics and the 1998 Winter Olympics. His father, Yūichirō Miura, became the oldest person to climb Mount Everest. Gota himself ascended Everest alongside his father on at least one occasion.

References

External links
 

1969 births
Living people
Japanese male freestyle skiers
Olympic freestyle skiers of Japan
Freestyle skiers at the 1994 Winter Olympics
Freestyle skiers at the 1998 Winter Olympics
People from Kamakura
Japanese summiters of Mount Everest
20th-century Japanese people